Abdirahim Ali Ismail Farah, nicknamed Qase is a Somali politician, and the current Mayor of Las Anod, the capital and the largest city of Sool region of Somaliland since 20 June 2021. He succeeded Abdiaziz Hussein Hassan on 20 June 2021 after the 2021 Somaliland municipal elections.

See also 

 Mayor of Las Anod
 Las Anod

References 

People from Las Anod
Mayors of places in Somaliland
Somaliland politicians
Year of birth missing (living people)
Living people